Friedrich Gempp (6 July 1873 – 21 April 1947) was a German army officer, who ultimately attained the rank of Major-General. He is credited as the founder and 1st Chief of the Intelligence Service (Abteilung Abwehr) of the Reichswehr in the Weimar Republic.

Biography

Career in the Imperial Army and the Reichswehr 

Gempp joined the Army in 1893 as a one-year volunteer enlistee (Einjährig-Freiwilliger) in the 1st Lower Alsatian Infantry Regiment, No. 132. After acquiring his appointment to the officer corps, he served as a Battalion adjutant. From 1903 to 1906, he attended the Prussian Military Academy. He then served in the General Staff and as company commander in the 2nd Upper-Alsace Infantry Regiment No. 171. In 1913 he was assigned as an intelligence officer to the I Army Corps.

After the mobilization for World War I, he had the same function in the General Staff of the Eighth Army and the Ober Ost (Eastern Front). In 1915 he was promoted to Major, and later in 1917 he was appointed to the Oberste Heeresleitung (Supreme Army Command) under Colonel Walter Nicolai, where he remained until its termination in October 1919.

In the Spring of 1920, he was appointed Lieutenant Colonel (Oberstleutnant) in the reconstruction of a new military intelligence service in the new Reichswehr. He served in its statistical office until his retirement with the nominal grade of Major General in June 1927.

The Gempp report and service in the Second World War 

From 1928 to 1944 he wrote a monumental report on Geheimer Nachrichtendienst und Spionageabwehr des Heeres, (Secret Intelligence Service and Counterintelligence of the Army in the First World War) the so-called Gempp report.
With the mobilization in 1939 for the Invasion of Poland, he was recalled to active service in the Intelligence Service (Abwehr) of the Oberkommando der Wehrmacht (OKW). He was assumed to be captured by the Soviet Army in 1945, and officially declared dead on 11 August 1946.

Arrest, death and rehabilitation 
Gempp was arrested by the Soviet Military Intelligence service on 10 April 1946, transferred to imprisonment in Moscow, and died on 3 January 1947 in the prison hospital of heart failure. On 10 September 2001, the Chief Military Prosecutor's Office of the Russian Federation declared the arrest to have been politically motivated, and he was "rehabilitated".

References

Further reading 
 Helmut Roewer, Stefan Schäfer, Matthias Uhl: Lexikon der Geheimdienste im 20. Jahrhundert. Herbig, München 2003, .
 Jürgen W. Schmidt: Gegen Russland und Frankreich. Der deutsche militärische Geheimdienst 1890–1914. 3rd ed.  Ludwigsfelder Verlags-Haus, Ludwigsfelde 2009,  (Geheimdienstgeschichte 1).
 Kenneth J. Campbell: Major General Friedrich Gempp: German Intelligence Leader. in: American Intelligence Journal. 25, 1, 2007, p. 75–81.
 Markus Pöhlmann: German Intelligence at War, 1914–1918. in: Journal of Intelligence History. 5, 2005, p. 33–62.

External links 
 Biography in the Bundesarchiv/Akten der Reichskanzlei

1873 births
1947 deaths
Major generals of the Reichswehr
Military personnel  from Freiburg im Breisgau
Abwehr